Chen Jitong (1851–1907), courtesy name Jingru, also known as Tcheng Ki-tong, was a Chinese diplomat, general, scholar, and shipbuilder during the late Qing dynasty. Chen was born in Houguan, now in present-day Minhou, Fuzhou. In 1869 he started to study the French language at the school attached to the Fuzhou shipyard. In 1875 Shen Baozhen sent thirty Chinese students, from the training school attached to the Foochow Arsenal to study shipbuilding and navigation in Europe. In 1876, Chen Jitong was selected to go to Europe and he wrote a book on his impressions after his return to China the following year. He subsequently served on a number of important positions in the Qing foreign service. While serving as a diplomat in France, he wrote several famous works in French, becoming the first Francophone Chinese author.

In 1891, he was dismissed from all official positions and settled in Shanghai. Following China's defeat in the First Sino-Japanese War, he served as foreign minister of the short-lived Republic of Formosa.

Writings
 -- Tcheng-ki-tong, Les Chinois peints par eux memes Paris: Levy, 1884. Internet Archive
 -- Journal d'un mandarin: lettres de Chine et documents  diplomatiques inédits Paris: Plom, 1887. Internet Archive
 -- The Chinese painted by themselves. Translated from the French by James Millington. London: Field & Tuer, [1885?] 
 -- Tcheng-Ki-Tong, Chin-Chin or The Chinaman at Home. Tr. R. H. Sherard. London: A. P. Marsden, 1895.
 -- Contes chinois Paris: Levy, 1889.

References
Yeh, Catherine Vance. "The Life-Style of Four Wenren in Late Qing Shanghai." Harvard Journal of Asiatic Studies 57, no. 2 (1997): 419–70.
 Ke Ren, "Chen Jitong, Les Parisiens peints par un Chinois, and the Literary Self-Fashioning of a Chinese Boulevardier in Fin-de-siècle Paris", L'Esprit créateur, Volume 56, Number 3, Fall 2016, Johns Hopkins University Press, pp. 90–103.

External links
 Speech by Chen (in French)
 

1851 births
1907 deaths
Qing dynasty diplomats
Ambassadors of China to France
Writers from Fuzhou
Qing dynasty politicians from Fujian
Politicians from Fuzhou
History of Taiwan
Sciences Po alumni
Chinese expatriates in France
Chinese shipbuilders
French-language writers from China